Tristan Casara (born 23 January 1987), known by his stage name The Avener, is a French deep house and electro DJ and music producer from Nice. He is best known for his 2014 single "Fade Out Lines", a deep house rework of "The Fade Out Line", a song by Phoebe Killdeer & The Short Straws.

Career

2014–2015: The Wanderings of the Avener

In September 2014 The Avener released his debut single "Fade Out Lines", a deep house rework of "The Fade Out Line", a song by Phoebe Killdeer & The Short Straws. The song peaked to number 3 in France. The song reached number 1 in Austria, Germany and Spain, the song was also a Top 10 hit in Australia, Belgium, Denmark, Italy and Switzerland. He released his debut studio album The Wanderings of the Avener in January 2015, peaking to number 2 in France. The album also includes the singles "Hate Street Dialogue", "To Let Myself Go" and "Panama".

In 2015, The Avener was partnered with the FIA World Endurance Championship and played a set at each race weekend.

In August 2015, it was revealed that The Avener is providing production for Mylène Farmer's forthcoming tenth studio album, including the lead single Stolen Car in duet with Sting.

Discography

Albums

Extended plays

Singles

References

External links
 Official website
 Facebook
 Interview with Sound.wav Music February 2015

1987 births
Living people
French record producers
People from Nice